Courten is a surname. Notable people with the surname include:

William Courten (1572–1636), English merchant
Courten baronets

See also
De Courten